The men's half marathon event at the 2015 Summer Universiade was held on 12 July at the Gwangju Universiade Main Stadium.

Medalists

Individual

Team

Results

Individual

Team

References

Detailed results

Half
2015